Brian Makepeace (born 6 October 1931) was an English footballer who captained and played as a right back for Doncaster Rovers.

Playing career

Youth
Whilst working at the pit, Makepeace played for Rossington Miners Welfare before moving to Jackie Bestalls Doncaster Rovers juniors in March 1949 as a 17-year-old.

Doncaster Rovers
His first game for the senior team was 17 February 1951 when Doncaster lost 4–2 away at Ewood Park against Blackburn Rovers, leaving Doncaster in 9th place in Division Two.

He later became club captain, and made a total of 378 appearances for Rovers in all competitions, without scoring a single goal.

He played for Boston United in the Midland League for the 1962–63 season.

On 28 December 2006, a testimonial match between a Doncaster XI and a fans XI was played for Makepeace. It was the last ever match to be played at Belle Vue.

His son-in-law is former West Bromwich Albion and Doncaster defender Paul Raven.

References

External links
http://www.doncasterrovers.co.uk/players/KtoM/Makepeace,Brian.htm

1931 births
Living people
People from Rossington
Footballers from Doncaster
English footballers
English Football League players
Association football fullbacks
Rossington Main F.C. players
Doncaster Rovers F.C. players
Boston United F.C. players